Judge Ware may refer to:

Ashur Ware (1782–1873), judge of the United States District Court for the District of Maine
James Ware (judge) (born 1946), judge of the United States District Court for the Northern District of California